George Fleming (born 22 September 1948) is a Scottish former footballer who played in midfield. With Dundee United he won the 1979-80 Scottish League Cup.

Career
Fleming made 132 league appearances for Hearts between 1966 and 1972.

In 1972 he joined Dundee United and won the Scottish League Cup in December 1979. That was his last season at United. He made 258 league appearances for the Tayside club.

He took a player/coach role at St Johnstone from 1980 to 1983.

He subsequently managed Arbroath in the mid-1980s.

Honours
 Scottish League Cup: 1
 1979–80

External links
 
 Glenrothes Arabs profile of Dundee United career

See also
 Dundee United F.C. records

1948 births
Living people
Footballers from Edinburgh
Scottish footballers
Heart of Midlothian F.C. players
Dundee United F.C. players
St Johnstone F.C. players
Scottish football managers
Arbroath F.C. managers
Scottish Football League managers
Scottish Football League players
Association football midfielders